Gârda de Sus is a commune located in Alba County, Transylvania, Romania. It has a population of 1,865, and is composed of seventeen villages: Biharia, Dealu Frumos, Dealu Ordâncușii, Dobrești, Gârda de Sus, Gârda Seacă (Alsógirda), Ghețari (Jégbarlang), Hănășești, Huzărești, Izvoarele, Munună, Ocoale, Plai, Pliști, Scoarța, Snide and Sucești.

It houses a wooded church built in 1792 with naive paintings inside. It is also the starting point for the hikes to the Ordâncușa gorges, the glacier of Scărișoara and the Padiș plateau.

References

Communes in Alba County
Localities in Transylvania